A low-rise is a building that is only a few stories tall or any building that is shorter than a high-rise, though others include the classification of mid-rise.

Definition
Emporis defines a low-rise as "an enclosed structure below 35 meters [115 feet] which is divided into regular floor levels". The city of Toronto defines a mid-rise as a building between four and twelve stories.  They also have elevators and stairs.

Characteristics

Low-rise apartments sometimes offer more privacy and negotiability of rent and utilities than high-rise apartments, although they may have fewer amenities and less flexibility with leases. It is easier to put fires out in low-rise buildings.

Within the United States, due to the legal-economic and modernist perspectives, low-rises can in some cities be seen as less luxurious than high-rises, whereas within Western Europe (for historical identity and legal reasons) low-rise tends to be more attractive.  Some businesses prefer low-rise buildings due to lower costs and more usable space. Having all employees on a single floor may also increase work productivity.

References

Structural system
Apartment types